WWLR (91.5 FM; "The Impulse") is a campus radio station broadcasting a student run format. Licensed to Lyndonville, Vermont, United States, the station is run by students, faculty and staff of Northern Vermont University—Lyndon (the former Lyndon State College).

History

WWLR began broadcasting on February 4, 1977, as a 10-watt outlet broadcasting on 91.7 MHz. In 1981, the station moved to 91.5 MHz as part of a power increase to 3,000 watts. However, three years later, the station was almost shut down when teachers complained about electromagnetic radiation, though administration kept it on the air; WWLR had been forced off the air earlier in 1984 in order to rectify interference to the meteorology equipment in the college's atmospheric sciences program. As a result, the WWLR tower was relocated, and the station temporarily operated at half-power until the tower was moved.

Vermont Public announced its acquisition of the WWLR license on December 16, 2022, with the intent of adding the station to its classical music network; the student-run programming will continue as an Internet radio station. The trustees of the Vermont State Colleges had voted to put WWLR up for sale in October 2022, after having earlier approved a plan to relinquish the license in December 2021.

References

External links
 
 
 

WLR
WLR
Radio stations established in 1977
1977 establishments in Vermont
Lyndon State College